Cassius Marcellus Coolidge (September 18, 1844 – January 13, 1934) was an American artist, mainly known for his series of paintings Dogs Playing Poker. Known as "Cash" or "Kash" in his family, he often signed his work in the 19th century with the latter spelling, sometimes spelling his name, for comic effect, as Kash Koolidge.

Early life
Coolidge was born in Antwerp, New York to abolitionist Quaker farmers, and was raised in Philadelphia, New York.

He had little formal training as an artist.

Career

After leaving the family farm in the early 1860s, Coolidge had many careers. Between 1868 and 1872 he worked as a druggist and sign painter, founded a bank and a newspaper, then moved from Antwerp, New York, to Rochester, where he started painting dogs in human situations.

Editorial work
Coolidge began his art career in his twenties, one of his early jobs being the creation of cartoons for a local newspaper.

Comic foregrounds
He is credited with creating "comic foregrounds," novelty photographs which combined a portrait of the sitter with a caricatured body, produced by the sitter holding between two sticks a canvas on which Coolidge drew or painted the caricature, which he patented. The final product was similar to the photographs produced using photo stand-ins at midways and carnivals where people place their heads into openings in life-size caricatures.

Calendar paintings

According to the advertising firm Brown & Bigelow, then primarily a producer of advertising calendars, Coolidge began his relationship with the firm in 1903. From the mid-1900s to the mid-1910s, Coolidge created a series of sixteen oil paintings for them, all of which featured anthropomorphic dogs, including nine paintings of Dogs Playing Poker, a motif that Coolidge is credited with inventing.

The series of 16 commissioned paintings and their themes are:

A Bachelor's Dog – reading the mail
A Bold Bluff – poker
Breach of Promise Suit – testifying in court
A Friend in Need – poker, cheating
His Station and Four Aces – poker
New Year's Eve in Dogville – ballroom dancing
One to Tie Two to Win – baseball
Pinched with Four Aces – poker, illegal gambling
Poker Sympathy – poker
Post Mortem – poker, camaraderie
The Reunion – smoking and drinking, camaraderie
Riding the Goat – Masonic initiation
Sitting up with a Sick Friend – poker, gender relations
Stranger in Camp – poker, camping
Ten Miles to a Garage – travel, car trouble, teamwork
Waterloo – poker

Other paintings
Additional paintings in a similar vein include:

Kelly Pool (ca. 1909) – pool

Named for the then-common pool-game Kelly pool, Coolidge's painting of dogs playing pool may be considered a progenitor of another memetic pop-culture art genre, that of "dogs playing pool."

Auction records
On February 15, 2006, two Coolidge paintings, A Bold Bluff and Waterloo, which may have been the originals of the paintings used by Brown & Bigelow, went on the auction block at Doyle New York. Expected to fetch between $30,000 and $50,000, the pair sold for $590,400. The result surpassed the previous auction record of $74,000 for a Coolidge.

Coolidge's 1894 Poker Game realized $658,000 at a Sotheby's New York sale on 18 November 2015.

References

Bibliography

External links

 
Unofficial Cassius Coolidge biography from DogsPlayingPoker.org

Article in Watertown Daily Times announcing Philadelphia, New York Museum and noting Philadelphia, New York as the true birthplace of Cassius M. Coolidge

1844 births
1934 deaths
19th-century American painters
American male painters
20th-century American painters
People from Antwerp, New York
Artists from New York (state)
American illustrators
19th-century American male artists
20th-century American male artists